Ulug-Khemsky District (Ulug-Xem kojuun) is an administrative and municipal district (raion, or kozhuun), one of the seventeen in the Tuva Republic, Russia. It is located in the center of the republic and borders Yermakovsky District of Krasnoyarsk Krai in the north, Kyzylsky and Chedi-Kholsky Districts in the east, Ovyursky and Tes-Khemsky Districts in the south, and Chaa-Kholsky District in the west. Its administrative center is the town of Shagonar. As of the 2010 Census, the total population of the district was 19,266, with the population of Shagonar accounting for 56.9% of that number.

History
Ulug-Khemsky Kozhuun was established within the Tuvan People's Republic on September 8, 1923. It became Ulug-Khemsky District on October 13, 1944, when the Tuvan People's Republic became a part of the Soviet Union. In 1957, its territory was enlarged by appending Bayan-Kolsky Selsoviet. In April 1961, Chaa-Kholsky District was merged into Ulug-Khemsky District. On February 25, 1975, Bayan-Kolsky Selsoviet was transferred back to Kyzylsky District, and Chaa-Kholsky District was split back out on December 20, 1991. When Chedi-Kholsky District was established on December 21, 1992, Khonderginsky Selsoviet of Ulug-Khemsky District was transferred to it.

References

Notes

Sources

Districts of Tuva
States and territories established in 1923
